Holy Forty Martyrs Church is a Christian temple dedicated to the Forty Martyrs of Sebaste and may refer to:

Bulgaria
Holy Forty Martyrs Church, Veliko Tarnovo

Syria
Forty Martyrs Cathedral in Aleppo
Forty Martyrs Cathedral, Homs

United Kingdom
 Forty Martyrs Church in the Parish of St Bede's Church, Rotherham, South Yorkshire.